Ompok pabo or Pabo catfish is a freshwater fish from the family Siluridae (Sheatfishes) native to Pakistan, North-East India, Bangladesh and Myanmar. It is found in rivers, ponds and lakes. It can grow up to the length of 25 cm.।

References

Siluridae
Freshwater fish of India
Fish described in 1822